The Sainsbury Laboratory Cambridge University (or SLCU) is located in Cambridge University Botanic Garden. Its aim is to elucidate the regulatory systems underlying plant growth and plant development.

Senior research staff
As of 2022 Senior research staff include:

Professor Henrik Jönsson, Director
Dr James Locke, Associate Director and Royal Society University Research Fellow
Professor Ottoline Leyser FRS, Research Group Leader
Professor Yrjö Helariutta, Research Group Leader
Professor Elliot Meyerowitz, Inaugural Director and Distinguished Associate
Professor Giles Oldroyd, Research Group Leader
Dr Alexander Jones, Research Group Leader
Dr Edwige Moyroud, Research Group Leader
Dr François Nédélec, Research Group Leader
Dr Sebastian Schornack, Research Group Leader and Royal Society University Research Fellow
Dr Chris Whitewoods, Career Development Fellow
Dr Sarah Robinson, Career Development Fellow
Dr Renske Vroomans, Career Development Fellow

History
The Sainsbury Laboratory houses 120 plant scientists studying plant development and diversity in state-of-the-art laboratory facilities. The building was made possible by the award of an £82M grant from the Gatsby Charitable Foundation. Construction of the 11,000-square metre building, led by Kier Group, began in the private working and research area of the Botanic Garden in February 2008 and was completed in December 2010. The building was opened on 27 April 2011 by Queen Elizabeth II in the presence of Prince Philip, Duke of Edinburgh.
The laboratory building also provides plant growth facilities and a home for the University Herbarium, which contains over one million pressed and dried plant specimens from around the world, including the great majority of those collected by Charles Darwin on the Beagle Voyage, and scientific research material relating to newly discovered plants from the 18th and 19th
centuries.

Building
The Laboratory meets Cambridge City Council’s planning requirement for 10% renewable on-site energy generation through use of photovoltaic panels, and has been awarded a BREEAM ‘Excellent’ rating.
The Gilmour Suite, in a wing of the Sainsbury Laboratory, provides a public café and terrace for Botanic Garden visitors and is open all year during Garden public opening hours.
The building was awarded the Stirling Prize for architecture in 2012.

Artwork
The laboratory has several artworks including:

References

Research institutes in Cambridge
Biological research institutes in the United Kingdom
Botanical research institutes
Sainsbury Laboratory